Kang Cheol-min (July 26, 1939 – 2002) was a professional Go player.

Biography 

Kang became a professional in 1958. It took him 40 years to reach the level of 8 dan. He died in 2002.

Titles and runners-up 

1939 births
2002 deaths
South Korean Go players